Badr Salem Nayef (born Petar Tanev; October 29, 1972 in Bulgaria), is a Qatari weightlifter. He is the 1999 world champion.

One of eight Bulgarian weightlifters recruited by the Qatar Olympic Committee for $1,000,000, Badr Salem Nayef became a Qatari citizen to represent the country. His old name, Petar Tanev, was left behind in the process. Qatar has been known for recruiting sportspeople from other countries, the most notable examples being fellow weightlifter Said Saif Asaad (formerly Angel Popov of Bulgaria) and world-class runner Saif Saaeed Shaheen.

Notes and references 

1972 births
Living people
Bulgarian emigrants to Qatar
Bulgarian male weightlifters
Qatari male weightlifters
Naturalised citizens of Qatar
European Weightlifting Championships medalists
World Weightlifting Championships medalists